Rudransh Mathur (born October 10, 1990) is an interaction designer, filmmaker and a media artist.

Career as 'child prodigy'

'Birds Through My Window'
Mathur entered the Vatavaran 2003: Environment film festival, a national film festival held annually in India, at the age of 13, "when he was a student of Class VIII" reported The Telegraph of India

"Rudransh’s foremost film, Birds Through My Window, was also screened at the CMS Vatavaran Environment and Wildlife Film Festival, where he procured the Golden Tree award, customarily conferred to the best child filmmaker."

Birds Through My Window also won best film award at the Vasundhara Film Festival, Pune in 2006. Film director Jean-Jacques Scaerou is reported as saying that "Rudransh’s films entail uncanny professionalism and finesse, irrespective of his age".

Awards and distinctions
Mathur won the special jury award for "Yet Another Gullivers Travels" at the Chinh India festival, 2008.

Mathur was selected as an Indian representative in the international youth meet "Jeunes Du Monde" in
Toulouse, France, where two of his films "Panchgani: Une Fenêtre Sur L’Inde" and "La Violence Verte"
were screened.

Mathur edited the documentary "River Goddess" which won the award in the educational video film
festival 2006 conducted by the UGC.

Mathur made the film "Tiger & Monkey", an 8 min animation film, for Tribal Research and Training Institute, Pune, Government of India, for use in teaching tribal children English. Mathur also designed the accompanying storybook as a teaching aid.

"Birds Through My Window" was selected for the "CMS Greening Young Minds School Outreach
Programme", to be shown in 10,000 schools across India.

Filmography

Directed and edited 
2003– Birds through my window ( Documentary, English, 18 min)

2005- Yet another Gulliver’s travels (Documentary, English,11 min)

2007– Panchgani: une fenetre sur l’inde  (Documentary, French, 9 min)

2007- La Violence Verte  (Documentary, French, 7 min)

2009- Run George Run (Stop Motion Animation, 9 min)

2009- Simple Joy (2DAnimation, 3 min)

2009- Curious intruder (Documentary, English, 7min)

2009 - Driving Earth (2DAnimation, 9 min)

2010- The Tiger & the Monkey (Mixed Media, 8 min)

2010- The Baker (Stop Motion Animation, 2 min)

2010- Rules of Reality (Fiction, 2 min)

2011- Pratapgarh: the hill fort (Documentary, 9min)

Edited 
2006- Fire on the Mountain

2006- Pratibha Mhante Paani Nah

2007- River Goddess

2008- Aapa Akka ("Rough Cut")

2009- Sanjeewan Vidyalaya- Nurturing life

2009- Red Ink

References

External links
 
 Express India
 Roots and Wings India
 Indian Wildlife Club
 Culture Unplugged
 CMS Envis
 Lights Camera Help
 CMS Vatavaran

1990 births
Living people
Indian filmmakers
20th-century Indian designers